The 1976 Brownlow Medal was the 49th year the award was presented to the player adjudged the fairest and best player during the Victorian Football League (VFL) home and away season. Graham Moss of the Essendon Football Club won the medal by polling forty-eight votes during the 1976 VFL season. The count was the first of two occasions in which the two field umpires independently voted for the best players on the ground under the 3-2-1 system. This meant that the winner of the Brownlow had a higher number of votes than usual. From 1978 onwards, the field umpires conferred after each game and awarded a single set of votes, rather than voting independently.

Leading votegetters

References 

1976 in Australian rules football
1976